Heeb is a Jewish website (and from 2001 to 2010, a quarterly magazine) aimed predominantly at young Jews. The name of the publication is a variation of the ethnic slur "hebe", an abbreviation of Hebrew. However, in this case, the word "heeb" seeks to function as empowerment for the Jewish community, thus eliminating the hatred associated with the word.

Origin
The magazine was founded by Jennifer Bleyer, a graduate of Columbia University, and backed financially by Steven Spielberg and Charles Bronfman.  Bleyer, who now writes for The New York Times, ended her association with the magazine in 2003. Taking over for her as editor and publisher was Harvard Divinity School graduate Joshua Neuman.  Neuman's goal was to spread the idea of Heeb as a "lifestyle magazine", incorporating events like a traveling Heeb Storytelling show in order to reach an underserved Jewish progressive market around the country.  The magazine's subtitle was "The New Jew Review".

Highlights
It has become known for its satire and sardonic approach to reaching Jewish readers of all streams.  In a late 2006 edition, a live pig was photographed running across a traditional Sabbath dinner table.  Heeb’s satirist, David Deutsch, who used his own table to stage the photos asked his rabbi if it were kosher to use a live pig on his table for this purpose, as pig meat is considered unkosher. His rabbi said it wasn't a problem, but recommended that he wash the table afterwards.

The magazine is decidedly anti-establishment and left-wing.  It frequently criticizes mainstream American Jewish culture, most famously in an article entitled "Joe Lieberman is a Dickhead."  The author of the piece took Lieberman to task for favoring an increase in military spending. Other writers who have contributed to Heeb include Allen Salkin, who wrote "Where Have You Gone Sandy Koufax?", an article about Jews obsessed with Jews in sports, and "Why are We So Guilty?".

Heeb has produced events around the world, including the Heeb Storytelling series. The series has been attended by Natalie Portman, Rose McGowan, Kate Beckinsale and Colin Farrell.

In March 2004, in its fifth issue, Heeb featured the photo spread entitled Crimes of Passion that spoofed Mel Gibson's The Passion of the Christ.  The spread included a half naked Virgin Mary (with pierced nipples) and a Jesus with his genitals wrapped in a tallit.  

The Catholic League, in its 2004 Report on Anti-Catholicism stated: 
The Jewish magazine Heeb published a 10-page photo feature in its Winter 2004 edition mocking Mel Gibson's movie 'The Passion of the Christ' called 'Back Off, Braveheart'. The editors who introduced the spread said that the death of Jesus was 'summarily blamed upon the Jews', until this 'fondly held belief seemed destined to fade forever' after Vatican II.  A sexually suggestive Jesus played by artist Carlos J. Da Silva wears a Jewish prayer shawl as a loin cloth, and the Blessed Mother was shown exposing her breasts and body piercing. The occupation of the model photographed as Mary Magdalene was described as 'Evangelist-cum-nymphomaniac country singer'. She was quoted as saying, 'Who killed Jesus? Ryan Adams.' The woman who was photographed as Pontius Pilate was quoted as saying, 'Christians believe the Jews killed Jesus; that is why there is so much anti-Semitism in the world. The church was created on that one simple anti-Semitic principle. Christians who say otherwise are making it up or misrepresenting their own religion.'

Abraham Foxman, director of the Anti-Defamation League (ADL) published a letter to Heeb decrying the spread as "blasphemous to both Christians and Jews".

On the April 27, 2004, episode of The Daily Show, Jon Stewart remarked "the best solution to international terrorism? The giveaway. For any international terrorist who turns himself in—a free lifetime subscription to Heeb."

On June 17, 2004, the Chicago Tribune named Heeb one of America's "50 best magazines."

In January 2006, Heeb was included as part of the Library of Congress' exhibition "350 Years of Jewish Life in America."

A March 28, 2007, feature in The New York Times Business Section spotlighted how Heeb did creative work for advertisers seeking to reach a young Jewish demographic. The article was accompanied by a photo of three men dressed as Hasidic versions of characters from A Clockwork Orange.

Robert Crumb and wife Aline Kominsky-Crumb illustrated the cover of the magazine's "Love Issue" in the Spring of 2007. As Aline told the magazine in an interview: "I had read Robert's work before I met him and I thought he was Jewish because he's just so whiny."

Rush Hour director Brett Ratner guest edited Heeb'''s 2008 Summer Edition and included what the magazine claimed to be the first-ever Jewish swimsuit calendar, for the Jewish year 5769, "The Ladies of '69." The calendar was photographed by Elle magazine cover photographer Gilles Bensimon and featured Israeli supermodels Bar Refaeli, Esti Ginzberg and Moran Atias, among others. Ratner also photographed director Roman Polanski at Auschwitz, the site of the Polish-born director's mother's murder during the Holocaust. 

In the Fall of 2008, Heeb released its "Politics Issue." The cover, a group of coins being dropped into a hand, was designed by Shepard Fairey's Studio Number One and was a play on Fairey's iconic Obama "Change" image.

In Heeb's Winter 2008 edition, Courtney Love told Heeb of ex-husband Kurt Cobain's legacy: "Every time you buy a Nirvana record, part of that money is not going to Kurt's child, or to me, it's going to a handful of Jew loan officers, Jew private banks, it's going to lawyers who are also bankers...." 

In 2009, Heeb produced its controversial Germany Issue in which Roseanne Barr posed as Adolf Hitler in drag holding a tray of "burned Jew cookies." The photo invoked the ire of Bill O'Reilly on Fox's The O'Reilly Factor.

In 2009 Heeb released an anthology from its Heeb Storytelling Series titled Sex, Drugs & Gefilte Fish.Heeb ceased publishing the print edition of its magazine in 2010, but continues to publish a daily weblog.

 Trademark controversy 
Heeb Media, LLC has owned the trademark registration for Heeb magazine publications since 29 June 2004. On 1 February 2005, the application was submitted to receive another registration number for the use of Heeb for apparel and entertainment. The original application was denied under Section 2(a) of the Trademark Act, 15 U.S.C.§1052(a). Heeb Media submitted an appeal to the Trademark Trail and Appeal Board (TTAB) at the US Patent and Trademark Office (USPTO) on 26 November 2008, but it was officially denied and abandoned in June 2009. As record of evidence, Heeb Media submitted letters of their own, which stated that the magazine, although criticised by some Jewish and non-Jewish communities that may take offence to the name Heeb, it is widely accepted among the Jewish student population.https://www.washingtonpost.com/news/morning-mix/wp/2014/06/19/how-the-case-of-heeb-media-paved-the-way-for-the-redskins-trademark-decision/  The Administrative Trademark judge, Karen Kuhlke stated in the official comments that although the applicant submitted sufficient information, it was still not foreseeable to justify the term Heeb as something non-derogative. Kuhlke was also the judge for the Redskins appeal in 2014, in which she cited the Heeb'' case.

References

External links 
 
Press about Heeb
Catholic League 2004 Report on Anti-Catholicism
ADL Letter to Heeb
Heeb interview with Naomi Klein

Satirical magazines published in the United States
Quarterly magazines published in the United States
Defunct magazines published in the United States
Jewish magazines published in the United States
Magazines established in 2001
Magazines disestablished in 2010
Online magazines with defunct print editions
Online magazines published in the United States
Magazines published in New York City